Sara "Sari" Mitić (born 1995) is a Serbian model and beauty pageant titleholder. She was Miss Adriatic Europe 2013 and first runner-up at Miss Serbia 2016.

Early life and pageantry
Sara was born and raised in Niš, Serbia. She has engaged in ballet, swimming, and tennis. In 2017 she is a law student, who also plays college volleyball.

Sara started modeling at 12 years of age and participated in many beauty pageants. She won Miss Bikini Balcan 2012, Miss Tourism Europe 2013, Miss Adriatic Europe 2013, and Miss Porto Carras 2016. She was the 1st runner-up to Miss Serbia 2016.

In 2017 she presided over Miss Adriatic Europe.

External links

References

Living people
Serbian female models
Serbian beauty pageant winners
1997 births